Jonathan Anthony Solis "John" Lapus (born July 7, 1973), also known as Sweet, is a Filipino actor, host, comedian and film and television director. Lapus is known for his various roles in films such as Shake, Rattle & Roll.

He was a headwriter at Showbiz Linggo at ABS-CBN in the early to late '90s he hosted Philippine Showbiz talk shows such as Entertainment Konek, The Buzz, S-Files and Showbiz Central for GMA-7 he would later score more success in films such as Temptation Island, Moron 5 and the Crying Lady for Viva Films as the main antagonist its sequel Moron 5.2: The Transformation as Becky Pamintuan In 2021 he returns to the web streaming film Barumbadings in 2021.

Biography
Stiph Oblina (Screen Name: John Lapus) is son of showbiz columnist, the late Jojo Lapus (1943–2006). Lapus started his career in 1993 and worked as a researcher of ABS-CBN's Showbiz Lingo. He is also an alumnus of University of Santo Tomas, where he was an active member of Teatro Tomasino. He appeared in numerous ABS-CBN shows and often moonlighted as a Creative Consultant for the network's film arm, Star Cinema. His nickname "Sweet" was named after his character in the sitcom Arriba, Arriba!. In 2006, he transferred to GMA Network, joining S-Files after his assignments at ABS-CBN dwindled.  When S-Files was cancelled by the network he was named main host of Showbiz Central together with Pia Guanio and Raymond Gutierrez. Since then, his career has experienced resurgence. He has planned to portray the villain character Ida in Zaido but Paolo Ballesteros was chosen for this character. Lapus won two awards namely, Best Male Stand-Up Comic in Aliw Awards 2006 and Best Game Show Host (along with Ai-Ai de las Alas) for ABC-5 (now TV5)'s Sing Galing in PMPC Star Awards 2004.

Lapus is openly gay. He returned to his original home network ABS-CBN but in 2012, he was still in GMA for joining the cast of Makapiling Kang Muli. He had been cast first at Ikaw Ay Pag-Ibig, Kahit Konting Pagtingin and now at Mirabella which he was known as the foster father Paeng Robles.

Filmography

Films

Television

Director
Wansapanataym (ABS-CBN)
Kadenang Ginto (ABS-CBN 2019–2020)
Ipaglaban Mo (2019)
Maalaala Mo Kaya (2019)
 BalitaOneNan (2022)
 Jose & Maria's Bonggang Villa (2022-present)

Awards

References

External links

1973 births
Living people
ABS-CBN personalities
Filipino film directors
Filipino male comedians
Filipino male film actors
Filipino male television actors
Filipino screenwriters
Filipino television directors
Filipino television personalities
Filipino television talk show hosts
Filipino television variety show hosts
LGBT film directors
LGBT television directors
Filipino LGBT screenwriters
GMA Network personalities
Gay screenwriters
Gay comedians
Filipino LGBT broadcasters
Filipino gay actors
Filipino gay writers
People from Quezon City
TV5 (Philippine TV network) personalities
University of Santo Tomas alumni
20th-century Filipino male actors
21st-century Filipino male actors